The Mangyongdae Children's Palace (or Mangyongdae School Children's Palace) in Pyongyang is a public facility managed by Korean Youth Corps in North Korea where pioneer members can engage in extra-curricular activities, such as learning music, foreign languages, computing skills and sports. It is the largest of the palaces in North Korea dedicated to children's after-school activities. In front of the Children's Palace there are a grand sculpture group and two enormous fountains, rising 90 and 100 metres.

The Mangyongdae Children's Palace has 120 rooms, a swimming pool, a gymnasium and a 2,000-seat theatre. The Mangyongdae Children's Palace is not to be confused with the  situated in the north of the Kim Il-sung Square and founded in 1963.

See also 
Mangyongdae-guyok
Education in North Korea
Children's Palace (China)

References

Further reading

External links 

Steps for Cultural Diplomacy by Kim Laskowski at Juilliard.edu
Mangyongdae Schoolchildren's Palace picture album  at Naenara

Pioneer movement
Education in Pyongyang
Child-related organizations in North Korea
Educational institutions established in 1989
1989 establishments in North Korea
20th-century architecture in North Korea